The order Lamiales (also known as the mint order) are an order in the asterid group of dicotyledonous flowering plants. It includes about 23,810 species, 1,059 genera, and is divided into about 25 families. These families include Acanthaceae, Bignoniaceae, Byblidaceae, Calceolariaceae,Carlemanniaceae, Gesneriaceae, Lamiaceae, Lentibulariaceae, Linderniaceae, Martyniaceae, Mazaceae, Oleaceae, Orobanchaceae, Paulowniaceae, Pedaliaceae,  Peltantheraceae, Phrymaceae, Plantaginaceae, Plocospermataceae, Schlegeliaceae, Scrophulariaceae, Stilbaceae, Tetrachondraceae, Thomandersiaceae, Verbenaceae.

Being one of the largest orders of flowering plants, Lamiales have representatives found all over the world. Well-known or economically important members of this order include lavender, lilac, olive, jasmine, the ash tree, teak, snapdragon, sesame, psyllium, garden sage, and a number of table herbs such as mint, basil, and rosemary.

Description
Plant species within the order Lamiales are eudicots and are herbaceous or have woody stems.  Zygomorphic flowers are common in Lamiales, having five petals with an upper lip of two petals and lower lip of three petals, however actinomorphic flowers are also seen.  Plant species within the order Lamiales potentially have five stamens, but these are typically reduced to two or four. Lamiales also produce a single style attached to an ovary typically containing two carpels. The ovary in the Lamiales order is mostly observed to be superior.  Lamiales inflorescence is typically seen as cyme, raceme or spike.  Fruit type in Lamiales order is usually dehiscent capsules.  Glandular hairs are present in Lamiales.

Habitat 
The Lamiales order can be found in almost all kinds of habitats world-wide. These habitats include forests, valleys, grasslands, rocky terrain, rainforests, the tropics, temperate regions, marshes, coastlines, and even frozen areas.

Carnivore plants 

A number of species of carnivorous plants are found in the Lamiales, in the families Lentibulariaceae and Byblidaceae. Protocarnivorous plant species have also been found in the order Lamiales, specifically in the families Martyniaceae.

Parasitic plants 

Parasitic plant species are found in the order Lamiales, belonging to the family Orobanchaceae. These parasitic plants can either be hemi-parasites or holoparasites.

Uses 
The order Lamiales has a variety of species with anthropogenic uses, the most popular belonging to the Lamiaceae and Acanthaceae families. Many of these species in the order Lamiales produce medicinal properties from alkaloids and saponins to help a variety of infections and diseases. These alkaloids and saponins may help with digestion, the common cold or flu, asthma, liver infections, pulmonary infections and contain antioxidant properties.

Plant species within the order Lamiales are also known to have properties to repel insects and help control harmful diseases from insects, such as Malaria from mosquitos. The plant family Acanthaceae within the Lamiales order have bioactive secondary metabolites within their mature leaves, which have been found to be toxic to insect larvae. Botanical derived insecticides are a good alternate for chemical or synthetic insecticides as it is inexpensive, abundant and safe for other plants, non-target organisms and the environment.

Many species within the order Lamiales are also used as decorations, flavouring agents, cosmetics and fragrances. Natural dyes can also be extracted from plant species within Lamiales. For example, in Sardinia culture, the most common Lamiales plant species used for natural dyes is Lavandula stoechas, where a light-green dye is extracted from the stem

Taxonomy
The Lamiales previously had a restricted circumscription (e.g., by Arthur Cronquist) that included the major families Lamiaceae (Labiatae), Verbenaceae, and Boraginaceae, plus a few smaller families. In the classification system of Dahlgren the Lamiales were in the superorder Lamiiflorae (also called Lamianae). Recent phylogenetic work has shown the Lamiales are polyphyletic with respect to order Scrophulariales and the two groups are now usually combined in a single order that also includes the former orders Hippuridales and Plantaginales. Lamiales has become the preferred name for this much larger combined group. The placement of the Boraginaceae is unclear, but phylogenetic work shows this family does not belong in Lamiales.

Also, the circumscription of family Scrophulariaceae, formerly a paraphyletic group defined primarily by plesiomorphic characters and from within which numerous other families of the Lamiales were derived, has been radically altered to create a number of smaller, better-defined, and putatively monophyletic families.

Dating 
Much research has been conducted in recent years regarding the dating the Lamiales lineage, although there still remains some ambiguity. A 2004 study, on the molecular phylogenetic dating of asterid flowering plants, estimated 106 million years (MY) for the stem lineage of Lamiales. A 2009 study on angiosperm diversification through time, concluded an inferred age of lower Eocene, ca. 50 MY, for Lamiales.

References

External links
Lamiales
A parsimony analysis of the Asteridae sensu lato based on rbcL sequences
Disintegration of the Scrophulariaceae (deals with relationships throughout Lamiales)
L. Watson and M.J. Dallwitz (1992 onwards). The families of flowering plants: descriptions, illustrations, identification, information retrieval. http://delta-intkey.com
https://web.archive.org/web/20070609093942/http://www.biologie.uni-hamburg.de/b-online/vascular/acanth.htm 2002-09-06
https://web.archive.org/web/20070630151231/http://www.biologie.uni-hamburg.de/b-online/d52/52e.htm 2002-09-06
https://web.archive.org/web/20070609093206/http://www.biologie.uni-hamburg.de/b-online/d52/52efam.htm 2002-09-06
https://web.archive.org/web/20050914001131/http://www.science.siu.edu/parasitic-plants/Relation-Scroph.html
https://web.archive.org/web/20070311032641/http://www.rbgkew.org.uk/web.dbs/genlist.html 2002-09-06

 
Angiosperm orders